Pęzino Castle - a castle located in centre of the village of Pęzino, West Pomeranian Voivodeship; in Poland. The castle is located by the River Krąpiel and its tributary River Pęzinka. Currently, the castle is privately owned, its owner uses the stronghold primarily for hosting events, conferences and wedding celebrations.

History

The castle was raised by the Knights of Malta, which since 1382 had owned the castle - seeded to their ownership by the Borkowie. The castle has had a strategic location, being located in between the two rivers of Krąpiel and Pęzinka. The stronghold was built on an artificial hill, and its layout characteristics are similar to the nearby castles in Łagowo and Swobnica, with a four-part fortification wall surrounding an irregular courtyard which is linked up with the walls by living quarters, connected to the west of the fortification wall. The living quarters had windows only on the interior side of the castle to the courtyard.

In 1492, the castle was seeded as a feud to the Borkowie from the Knights of Malta. The Borkowie did not change the castle greatly apart from adding windows in the western fortification walls and adding gables to the living quarters. In 1600, the castle undergone extensive works adding a three floor living quarters, connected to the fortification walls. The castle was plastered and covered with bossage.

Since 1680, the castle was appointed to the Puttkamerów family, which became the castle's owners in 1703 In the mid-nineteenth century, a new wing has been built in a Gothic architectural style, known as Neo-Gothic. In the 1860s the Puttkamerów family deconstructed the outhouses around the castle, and in its place built gardens and a pavilion by the ruin of a chapel.

In 1935, a fire had devastated the eastern-wing of the castle. In 1936–1940, the castle was renovated and an additional gatehouse wing was built. After World War II, the castle was seized by the State Agricultural Farm in Pęzino. The castle began to slowly deteriorate. The renovation of the castle began in 1977 to 1990. The castle was sold by the State Agriculture Treasury in 1996 to a company called Rolmłyn.

See also
Castles in Poland

References

15th-century fortifications
Castles in West Pomeranian Voivodeship
Stargard County
Buildings and structures completed in 1382
1382 establishments in Europe